Eye of the Beholder was a Canadian travel documentary television miniseries which aired on CBC Television in 1974.

Premise
This series featured scenes from such nations as Brazil, Hong Kong, Peru, Spain and Thailand.

Scheduling
This half-hour series was broadcast Mondays, Wednesdays and Fridays at 4:30 p.m. (Eastern) from 9 to 20 September 1974. It was rebroadcast weekdays at 4:30 p.m. from 15 to 30 September 1977.

References

External links
 

CBC Television original programming
1974 Canadian television series debuts
1974 Canadian television series endings